Arman Shipyards was a shipbuilding company in Bordeaux, France, in the 18th and 19th centuries that built both merchant ships and warships. The company built two ironclads for the Confederate States Navy during the American Civil War : the Sphinx and the Chéops. From 1867 to 1871 it and its successors, managed the St. Nazaire shipyard of the Compagnie Générale Transatlantique until it closed in the latter year.

The company went bankrupt in 1868 due to overextension and economic reverses. The shipyard in Bordeaux was seized by the company's creditors and reformed into the Ateliers and Chantiers de Bacalan while the newly built shipyard and steam engine factory near Le Havre, France, were sold off to Forges et Chantiers de la Méditerranée in 1872.

Bibliography

Shipyards of France
Bordeaux
1868 disestablishments in France